Hermanus Richardus Johannes "Harry" Schulting (born 14 February 1956) is a Dutch former middle-distance runner and hurdler.

Schulting won a gold medal on the 400 m hurdles at the 1979 Summer Universiade in Mexico City in 48.44 seconds, a time that is still (as of 2022) the Dutch national record. At these games he also won a silver medal with the 4 × 400 m relay team. Schulting competed in the 1980 Summer Olympics on the 400 m, 4 × 400 m and the 400 m hurdling, but only reached the semifinals in the latter event.

References

1956 births
Living people
Dutch male hurdlers
Dutch male middle-distance runners
Athletes (track and field) at the 1980 Summer Olympics
Olympic athletes of the Netherlands
Sportspeople from Haarlem
Universiade medalists in athletics (track and field)
Universiade gold medalists for the Netherlands
Medalists at the 1979 Summer Universiade
20th-century Dutch people
21st-century Dutch people